4902 Thessandrus  is a Jupiter trojan from the Greek camp, approximately  in diameter. It was discovered on 9 January 1989, by American astronomer Carolyn Shoemaker at the Palomar Observatory in California, and later named after Thessander (Thessandrus) from Greek mythology. The dark D-type asteroid is an exceptionally slow rotator and tumbler. It belongs to the 70 largest Jupiter trojans.

Orbit and classification 

Thessandrus is a dark Jovian asteroid orbiting in the leading Greek camp at Jupiter's  Lagrangian point, 60° ahead of the Gas Giant's orbit in a 1:1 resonance . It is also a non-family asteroid in the Jovian background population.

It orbits the Sun at a distance of 5.0–5.4 AU once every 11 years and 10 months (4,337 days; semi-major axis of 5.2 AU). Its orbit has an eccentricity of 0.04 and an inclination of 9° with respect to the ecliptic.

A first precovery was taken at the discovering observatory in 1954, extending the body's observation arc by 35 years prior to its official discovery observation.

Physical characteristics 

Thessandrus has been characterized as a D-type asteroid by Pan-STARRS' survey. It is also a D-type in the SDSS-based taxonomy.

Slow rotator 

In February 2013, a rotational lightcurve of Thessandrus was obtained from photometric observations by American astronomer Robert Stephens at the Center for Solar System Studies  in California. It gave an exceptionally long rotation period of  hours with a brightness variation of 0.60 in magnitude. It belongs to the slowest rotators known to exist.

Tumbler 

The astronomers also detected a non-principal axis rotation seen in distinct rotational cycles in successive order. This is commonly known as tumbling. Thessandrus is the fourth-largest asteroid and largest Jupiter trojan known to be is such a state (also see List of tumblers).

Diameter and albedo 

According to the surveys carried out by the Japanese Akari satellite and the NEOWISE mission of NASA's Wide-field Infrared Survey Explorer, Thessandrus measures between 51.26 and 71.79 kilometers in diameter and its surface has an albedo between 0.060 and 0.081.

The Collaborative Asteroid Lightcurve Link assumes a standard albedo of a carbonaceous asteroid of 0.057 and calculates a diameter of 61.04 kilometers based on an absolute magnitude of 9.8.

Naming 

This minor planet is named after Thessander (Thessandrus) from Greek mythology and Homer's Iliad. Together with 30 other Greek soldiers he hid in the Trojan horse's belly. The official naming citation was published by the Minor Planet Center on 4 June 1993.

References

External links 
 Asteroid Lightcurve Database (LCDB), query form (info )
 Dictionary of Minor Planet Names, Google books
 Discovery Circumstances: Numbered Minor Planets (1)-(5000) – Minor Planet Center
 Asteroid 4902 Thessandrus at the Small Bodies Data Ferret
 
 

004902
Discoveries by Carolyn S. Shoemaker
Named minor planets
004902
19890109